The following is a list of television programs formerly or currently broadcast by the ‘’’Asian Food Channel’’’.

Programs

Australia 
 Appetite For Asia
 Conviction Kitchen
 Drive Thru Australia
 Food Lover's Guide to Australia
 A Fork in the Road Asia
 A Fork in the Road Australia
 A Fork in the Road Mediterranean
 Gondola on the Murray
 Good Chef Bad Chef
 Kylie Kwong: Cooking with Heart and Soul
 The Occasional Cook
 Savouring The World
 Wine Lover's Guide to Australia

Canada 
 At The Table With
 Chef at Home (Michael Smith)
 Chef at Large (Michael Smith)
 Chef School
 Chopped
 Chuck's Day Off
 City Cooks
 Conviction Kitchen
 Cook Like a Chef
 The Cookworks
 Dinner Party Wars
 The Family Restaurant
 Food Chain 
 Food Jammers
 French Food at Home
 French Leave
 Fresh with Anna Olson
 The Heat with Mark McEwan
 Licence to Grill
 Mountain Magic with Chef Michael Smith
 The Opener
 Opening Soon
 Perfect Day
 Pitchin In
 The Restaurant Adventures Of Caroline And Dave
 Restaurant Makeover
 Sizzle
 Sugar
 Sugar Christmas Special
 Tablescapes
 Veggie Table

China/Taiwan 
 All About Tea
 Coco Cooks
 Excellent Chef Series – Ah Jiao
 Excellent Chef Series – Da Bing
 Fantastic Chinese Cuisine with Chinese Medicine
 Path to Good Health

Indonesia 
 Ala Chef (with Farah Quinn)
 Taste Of Indonesia

Japan 
 Discover! The North Taste
 Dosanko Cooking (Sapporo Television Broadcasting)
 Fit for a King
 Flavourful Passport
 Go! Hokkaido Fishing
 Iron Chef
 Journey Hokkaido
 Ho Chak

Korea 
 Asian Cuisine Tour
 City of Taste
 Cuisine Korea

Malaysia 
 5 Rencah 5 Rasa
 Best Wan
 Doug Chew Cooks Asia
 Icip Icip
 Sajian
 Selera Asean
 Selera Asia
 Taste With Jason
 Yummy Trail

New Zealand 
 The Filth Files
 Taste New Zealand
 Taste Takes Off

Philippines 
 The Boss
 Foodie's Choice

Singapore 
 $2 Wonderfood
 All Star Potluck
 Chasing the Yum
 Chef in Black
 Chef Selebriti
 Chef Skuter
 Coffee Talk and Hawker Woks
 Cooking for Love
 Dish... with Vivien
 Driving Miss Foodie
 Enna Suvai Enna Ragasiyam
 Extreme Gourmet
 A Fare Exchange
 Flavours of Australia
 Food Chain
 Food Glorious Food
 Gila Makan
 Glamour-licious
 Gourmet Hunt
 Home Flavours
 Just Desserts
 Kilo 123
 Makansutra
 Malaysia Road Feast
 Masak Apa
 Party Guide for an Urbanite
 Rusiyo Rusi
 Sedap
 Sizzling Woks
 Slurp!
 Star Choice
 Table For Three
 Taste With Jason
 Ultimate Tastebud
 Yuk Buat Roti
 Yummy King

United Kingdom 
 Apocalypse Cow
 Blood, Sweat and Takeaways
 Christmas at River Cottage
 Christmas Cooks
 Costa Del Nosh
 Daily Cooks
 Drink of Kings – A History of Champagne
 The F Word
 Fish Food
 Forever Summer with Nigella
 The Grape Escape
 Hell's Kitchen 
 Kitchen Millionaire
 The Naked Chef
 Nigella Bites
 Ramsay's Kitchen Nightmares
 Saturday Cooks
 Saturday Kitchen
 Woman Who Ate Scotland

United States 
 After Hours With Daniel
 Avec Eric
 Best Recipes In The World
 Chef's Table
 Cooking Under Fire
 A Cook's Tour
 Follow That Tomato
 Food Hunter
 Food Trip With Todd English
 Hawaii Cooks with Roy Yamaguchi
 How To Cook Everything
 Jacques Pépin : Fast Food My Way
 The Kitchen Sessions with Charlie Trotter
 Martin Yan's China
 The Restaurant Adventures of Caroline and Dave 
 Return Of The Chef
 Secret Meat Business
 Spain On The Road Again

Others 
 Made in Spain with José Andrés
 Mexico: One Plate at a Time
 New Scandinavian Cooking (Norway)
 Tareq Taylor's Nordic Cookery
 Thailand: Tasty Journey

Asian Food Channel